Kim Gwang-jin (born 30 August 1956) is a North Korean gymnast. He competed in eight events at the 1980 Summer Olympics.

References

1956 births
Living people
North Korean male artistic gymnasts
Olympic gymnasts of North Korea
Gymnasts at the 1980 Summer Olympics
Place of birth missing (living people)
Asian Games medalists in gymnastics
Gymnasts at the 1978 Asian Games
Asian Games gold medalists for North Korea
Medalists at the 1978 Asian Games
20th-century North Korean people